Phloeus is a genus of longhorn beetles of the subfamily Lamiinae.

 Phloeus brevis Jordan, 1903
 Phloeus ruber Breuning, 1981

References

Ancylonotini